Hudson Bay (or), sometimes called Hudson's Bay (usually historically), is a large body of saltwater in northeastern Canada with a surface area of . It is located north of Ontario, west of Quebec, northeast of Manitoba and southeast of Nunavut, but politically entirely part of Nunavut. It is an inland marginal sea of the Arctic Ocean. Hudson Bay's southern arm is called James Bay.

Lake Winnipeg is similarly named by the local Cree, as is the location for the city of Winnipeg.

Description

The bay is named after Henry Hudson, an Englishman sailing for the Dutch East India Company, and after whom the river that he explored in 1609 is also named. Hudson Bay encompasses , making it the second-largest water body using the term "bay" in the world (after the Bay of Bengal). On the east it is connected with the Atlantic Ocean by Hudson Strait; on the north, with the Arctic Ocean by Foxe Basin (which is not considered part of the bay), and Fury and Hecla Strait.

Hudson Bay is often considered part of the Arctic Ocean: the International Hydrographic Organization, in its 2002 working draft of Limits of Oceans and Seas, defined Hudson Bay, with its outlet extending from 62.5 to 66.5 degrees north (just a few miles south of the Arctic Circle) as being part of the Arctic Ocean, specifically "Arctic Ocean Subdivision 9.11". Other authorities include it in the Atlantic, in part because of its greater water budget connection with that ocean.

History

The search for a western route to Cathay and the Indies, which had been actively pursued since the days of Columbus and the Cabots, in the latter part of the 15th century, directly resulted in the first sighting of Hudson Bay by Europeans. English explorers and colonists named Hudson Bay after Sir Henry Hudson who explored the bay beginning August 2, 1610, on his ship Discovery. On his fourth voyage to North America, Hudson worked his way around Greenland's west coast and into the bay, mapping much of its eastern coast. Discovery became trapped in the ice over the winter, and the crew survived onshore at the southern tip of James Bay. When the ice cleared in the spring, Hudson wanted to explore the rest of the area, but the crew mutinied on June 22, 1611. They left Hudson and others adrift in a small boat. The fate of Hudson and the crew members stranded with him is unknown, but historians have found no evidence that they survived for long afterward. In May 1612, Sir Thomas Button sailed from England with two ships to look for Henry Hudson, and to continue the search for the Northwest Passage to Asia.

In 1668, Nonsuch reached the bay and traded for beaver pelts, leading to the creation of the Hudson's Bay Company (HBC), which still bears the historic name. The HBC negotiated a trading monopoly from the English crown for the Hudson Bay watershed, called Rupert's Land. France contested this grant by sending several military expeditions to the region, but abandoned its claim in the Treaty of Utrecht (April 1713).

During this period, the HBC built several factories (forts and trading posts) along the coast at the mouth of the major rivers (such as Fort Severn, Ontario; York Factory, Churchill; and the Prince of Wales Fort). The strategic locations were bases for inland exploration. More importantly, they were trading posts with Indigenous peoples who came to them with furs from their trapping season. The HBC shipped the furs to Europe and continued to use some of these posts well into the 20th century.

In 1912, the western shore south of 60° and all the eastern shore were transferred to the adjacent provinces, but the bay and offshore islands remained part of the Northwest Territories. Starting in 1913, the bay was extensively charted by the Canadian government's  to develop it for navigation. This mapping progress led to the establishment of Churchill, Manitoba, as a deep-sea port for wheat exports in 1929, after unsuccessful attempts at Port Nelson.

The Port of Churchill was an important shipping link for trade with Europe and Russia until its closure in 2016 by owner OmniTRAX. The port and the Hudson Bay Railway were then sold to the Arctic Gateway Group—a consortium of First Nations, local governments, and corporate investors—in 2018. On July 9, 2019, ships on missions to resupply arctic communities began stopping at the port for additional cargo, and the port began shipping grain again on September 7, 2019.

Geography and climate

Extent
The International Hydrographic Organization defines the northern limit of Hudson Bay as follows:

Climate

Northern Hudson Bay has a polar climate (Köppen: ET) being one of the few places in the world where this type of climate is found south of 60 °N, going farther south towards Quebec, where Inukjuak is still dominated by the tundra. From Arviat, Nunavut, to the west to the south and southeast prevails the subarctic climate (Köppen: Dfc). This is because in the central summer months, heat waves can advance from the hot land and make the weather milder, with the result that the average temperature surpasses . At the extreme southern tip of the extension known as James Bay arises a humid continental climate with a longer and generally hotter summer.

The Hudson Bay region has very low year-round average temperatures. Vis-à-vis geographically closer Europe, contrasts stand much more extreme.

It is largely frozen over from mid-December to mid-June, when it usually clears from its eastern end westwards and southwards. A steady increase in regional temperatures over the last 100 years has been reflected in a lengthening of the ice-free period, which was as short as four months in the late 17th century.

Waters

Hudson Bay has a lower average salinity level than that of ocean water. The main causes are the low rate of evaporation (the bay is ice-covered for much of the year), the large volume of terrestrial runoff entering the bay (about  annually, the Hudson Bay watershed covering much of Canada, many rivers and streams discharging into the bay), and the limited connection with the Atlantic Ocean and its higher salinity. Sea ice is about three times the annual river flow into the bay, and its annual freezing and thawing significantly alters the salinity of the surface layer. Although its exact effects are not fully understood currently, the cyclonic storms in the bay are responsible for synoptic variability of salinity along the coast.

One consequence of the lower salinity of the bay is that the freezing point of the water is higher than in the rest of the world's oceans, thus decreasing the time that the bay remains ice-free. The increase of river inflows during the winter has decreased the season of sea ice by more than 1 month since the 1960s.

The lower salinity of the bay also has effects on the distribution and prevalence of common marine life such as micro algae. Research has shown that the lower salinity of the Hudson Bay limits the growth of micro algae, which causes a notable change in biomass along the bay's salinity gradient.

Shores
The area is drained by a large number of rivers and has formed a characteristic vegetation known as muskeg. Much of the landform has been shaped by the actions of glaciers and the shrinkage of the bay over long periods of time. Signs of numerous former beachfronts can be seen far inland from the current shore. A large portion of the lowlands in the province of Ontario is part of the Polar Bear Provincial Park, and a similar portion of the lowlands in Manitoba is contained in Wapusk National Park, the latter location being a significant polar bear maternity denning area.

In contrast, most of the eastern shores (the Quebec portion) form the western edge of the Canadian Shield in Quebec. The area is rocky and hilly. Its vegetation is typically boreal forest, and to the north, tundra.

Measured by shoreline, Hudson Bay is the largest bay in the world (the largest in area being the Bay of Bengal).

The distinctive arculate segment on the eastern shore of Hudson Bay is referred to as the Nastapoka arc.

Islands
There are many islands in Hudson Bay, mostly near the eastern coast. All the islands, including those in James Bay, are part of Nunavut and lie in the Arctic Archipelago. Several are disputed by the Cree. One group of islands is the Belcher Islands. Another group includes the Ottawa Islands.

Geology

Hudson Bay occupies a large structural basin, known as the Hudson Bay basin, that lies within the Canadian Shield.

From the large quantity of published geologic data that has been collected as the result of hydrocarbon exploration, academic research, and related geologic mapping, a detailed history of the Hudson Bay basin has been reconstructed. During the majority of the Cambrian Period, this basin did not exist. Rather, this part of the Canadian Shield area was still topographically high and emergent. It was only during the later part of the Cambrian that the rising sea level of the Sauk marine transgression slowly submerged it. During the Ordovician, this part of the Canadian Shield continued to be submerged by rising sea levels except for a brief middle Ordovician marine regression. Only starting in the Late Ordovician and continuing into the Silurian did the gradual regional subsidence of this part of the Canadian Shield form the Hudson Bay basin. The formation of this basin resulted in the accumulation of black bituminous oil shale and evaporite deposits within its centre, thick basin-margin limestone and dolomite, and the development of extensive reefs that ringed the basin margins that were tectonically uplifted as the basin subsided. During Middle Silurian times, subsidence ceased and this basin was uplifted. It generated an emergent arch, on which reefs grew, that divided the basin into eastern and western sub-basins. During the Devonian Period, this basin filled with terrestrial red beds that interfinger with marine limestone and dolomites. Before deposition was terminated by marine regression, Upper Devonian black bituminous shale accumulated in the south-east of the basin.

The remaining history of the Hudson Bay basin is largely unknown as a major unconformity separates Upper Devonian strata from glacial deposits of the Pleistocene. Except for poorly known terrestrial Cretaceous fluvial sands and gravels that are preserved as the fills of a ring of subsided strata around the centre of this basin, strata representing this period of time are absent from the Hudson Bay basin and the surrounding Canadian Shield.

The Precambrian Shield underlying Hudson Bay and in which Hudson Bay basin formed is composed of two Archean proto-continents, the Western Churchill and Superior cratons. These cratons are separated by a tectonic collage that forms a suture zone between these cratons and the Trans-Hudson Orogen. The Western Churchill and Superior cratons collided at about 1.9–1.8 Ga in the Trans-Hudson orogeny. Because of the irregular shapes of the colliding cratons, this collision trapped between them large fragments of juvenile crust, a sizable microcontinent, and island arc terranes, beneath what is now the centre of modern Hudson Bay as part of the Trans-Hudson Orogen. The Belcher Islands are the eroded surface of the Belcher Fold Belt, which formed as a result of the tectonic compression and folding of sediments that accumulated along the margin of the Superior Craton before its collision with the Western Churchill Craton.

Hudson Bay and the associated structural basin lies within the centre of a large free-air gravity anomaly that lies within the Canadian Shield. The similarity in areal extent of the free-air gravity anomaly with the perimeter of the former Laurentide Ice Sheet that covered this part of Laurentia led to a long-held conclusion that this perturbation in the Earth's gravity reflected still ongoing glacial isostatic adjustment to the melting and disappearance of this ice sheet. Data collected over Canada by the Gravity Recovery and Climate Experiment (GRACE) satellite mission allowed geophysicists to isolate the gravity signal associated with glacial isostatic adjustment from longer–time scale process of mantle convection occurring beneath the Canadian Shield. Based upon this data, geophysicists and other Earth scientists concluded that the Laurentide Ice Sheet was composed of two large domes to the west and east of Hudson Bay. Modelling glacial isostatic adjustment using the GRACE data, they concluded that ≈25 to ≈45% of the observed free-air gravity anomaly was due to ongoing glacial isostatic adjustment, and the remainder likely represents longer time-scale effects of mantle convection.

Southeastern semicircle
Earth scientists have disagreed about what created the semicircular feature known as the Nastapoka arc that forms a section of the shoreline of southeastern Hudson Bay. Noting the paucity of impact structures on Earth in relation to the Moon and Mars, Carlyle Smith Beals proposed that it is possibly part of a Precambrian extraterrestrial impact structure that is comparable in size to the Mare Crisium on the Moon. In the same volume, John Tuzo Wilson commented on Beals' interpretation and alternately proposed that the Nastapoka arc may have formed as part of an extensive Precambrian continental collisional orogen, linked to the closure of an ancient ocean basin. The current general consensus is that it is an arcuate boundary of tectonic origin between the Belcher Fold Belt and undeformed basement of the Superior Craton created during the Trans-Hudson orogeny. This is because no credible evidence for such an impact structure has been found by regional magnetic, Bouguer gravity, or other geologic studies. However, other Earth scientists have proposed that the evidence of an Archean impact might have been masked by deformation accompanying the later formation of the Trans-Hudson orogen and regard an impact origin as a plausible possibility.

Economy

Arctic Bridge
The longer periods of ice-free navigation and the reduction of Arctic Ocean ice coverage have led to Russian and Canadian interest in the potential for commercial trade routes across the Arctic and into Hudson Bay. The so-called Arctic Bridge would link Churchill, Manitoba, and the Russian port of Murmansk.

Port 

The biggest port in the Hudson bay is the city of Churchill, which lies on the river with the same name, Churchill River. The Port of Churchill is a privately owned port on Hudson Bay in Churchill, Manitoba, Canada. Routes from the port connect to the North Atlantic through the Hudson Strait. As of 2008, the port had four deep-sea berths capable of handling Panamax-size vessels for the loading and unloading of grain, bulk commodities, general cargo, and tanker vessels. The port is connected to the Hudson Bay Railway, which shares the same parent company, and cargo connections are made with the Canadian National Railway system at HBR's southern terminus in The Pas. It is the only port of its size and scope in Canada that does not connect directly to the country's road system; all goods shipped overland to and from the port must travel by rail.

The port was originally owned by the Government of Canada but was sold in 1997 to the American company OmniTRAX to run privately. In December 2015, OmniTRAX announced it was negotiating a sale of the port, and the associated Hudson Bay Railway, to a group of First Nations based in northern Manitoba. With no sale finalized by July 2016, OmniTRAX shut down the port and the major railroad freight operations in August 2016. The railway continued to carry cargo to supply the town of Churchill itself until the line was damaged by flooding on May 23, 2017. The Port and the Hudson Bay Railway were sold to Arctic Gateway Group—a consortium of First Nations, local governments, and corporate investors—in 2018. On July 9, 2019, ships on missions to resupply arctic communities began stopping at the port for additional cargo, and the port began shipping grain again on September 7, 2019.

Coastal communities

The coast of Hudson Bay is extremely sparsely populated; there are only about a dozen communities. Some of these were founded as trading posts in the 17th and 18th centuries by the Hudson's Bay Company, making them some of the oldest settlements in Western Canada. With the closure of the HBC posts and stores, although many are now run by The North West Company, in the second half of the 20th century, many coastal villages are now almost exclusively populated by Cree and Inuit. Two main historic sites along the coast were York Factory and Prince of Wales Fort.

Communities along the Hudson Bay coast or on islands in the bay are (all populations are as of 2016):

 Nunavut
 Arviat, population 2,657
 Chesterfield Inlet, population 437
 Coral Harbour, population 891
 Rankin Inlet, population 2,842
 Sanikiluaq, population 882
 Whale Cove, population 435
 Manitoba
 Churchill, population 899
 Ontario
 Fort Severn First Nation, population 361
 Quebec
 Akulivik, population 633
 Inukjuak, population 1,757
 Kuujjuarapik, population 686
 Puvirnituq, population 1,779
 Umiujaq, population 442
 Whapmagoostui, population 984

Military development
The Hudson's Bay Company built forts as fur trade strongholds against the French or other possible invaders. One example is York Factory with angled walls to help defend the fort. In the 1950s, during the Cold War, a few sites along the coast became part of the Mid-Canada Line, watching for a potential Soviet bomber attack over the North Pole. The only Arctic deep-water port in Canada is the Port of Churchill, located at Churchill, Manitoba.

See also

References

General sources 
 Atlas of Canada, online version.
 Some references of geological/impact structure interest include:
 Rondot, Jehan (1994). "Recognition of eroded astroblemes". Earth-Science Reviews 35, 4, pp. 331–365.
 Wilson, J. Tuzo (1968). "Comparison of the Hudson Bay arc with some other features". In: Science, History and Hudson Bay, v. 2. Beals, C. S. (editor), pp. 1015–1033.

External links

 

 
Borders of Nunavut
Landforms of Nord-du-Québec
Bodies of water of Manitoba
Bodies of water of Kivalliq Region
Bodies of water of Qikiqtaaluk Region
Bays of Ontario
Bays of Quebec
Bodies of water of the Atlantic Ocean
Seas of the Arctic Ocean
Seas of Canada
Bays of Nunavut